Arosa may refer to:

By place

Switzerland 
 Arosa is a municipality and Federal Statistical Office–defined town in the Swiss canton of Graubünden
 Arosa (Rhaetian Railway station), a railway station in Arosa, Graubünden, Switzerland
 EHC Arosa, a Swiss ice hockey team

Galicia 
 Arosa SC, a football team based in Villagarcía de Arosa, Spain
 Isla de Arosa, an island municipality in Galicia, Spain
 Villanueva de Arosa, a municipality in Pontevedra, Galicia, Spain
 Villagarcía de Arosa, a municipality in Pontevedra, Galicia, Spain
 Ría de Arosa, an estuary in Galicia, Spain

Other 
 1304 Arosa, an Asteroid
 SEAT Arosa, a city car manufactured by the Spanish automobile company SEAT
 S.S. Arosa Star was a United States cruise ship
 The Arousa Interglacial